Lycée Al Horreya Héliopolis, also known as Lycée La Liberté D'Héliopolis is a French-language school in Heliopolis, Cairo, Egypt.

History 

Lycée La Liberté D'Héliopolis opened in 1937 by the Mission Laïque Française.

Curriculum 

An English language section has been added to all school sections.

See also 

 Lycée Al-Horreya, Alexandria

References

External links 
 

Educational institutions established in 1937
International schools in Cairo
French international schools in Egypt
Private schools in Cairo
1937 establishments in Egypt